Shupe Peak is a  tall peak of Rampart Ridge located 4 miles (6 km) east-southeast of The Spire in the Royal Society Range, Victoria Land. It was named by Advisory Committee on Antarctic Names (US-ACAN) in 1994 after Gordon H. Shupe, United States Geological Survey (USGS) cartographic technician; conducted geodetic operations during three austral field seasons, 1990–94; USGS team leader for International Global Positioning System (GPS) Campaign, 1991–92, at McMurdo, Byrd, and South Pole Stations, and the Pine Island Bay area. The team established the first continuous-tracking GPS reference station in Antarctica.

Royal Society Range
Mountains of Victoria Land
Scott Coast